Nicolae Munteanu (born 7 December 1951) is a Romanian handball coach and former goalkeeper. He competed at the 1976, 1980 and 1984 Olympics and won one silver and two bronze medals; he scored one goal in 1980. At the club level he spent his entire career with Steaua București, winning with them 14 national titles. After retiring from competitions he managed French clubs US Dunkerque (1989–1990, 1991–1992) and HC Antibes (1990–1991). After 1992 he coached goalkeepers in Romania.

References

1951 births
Living people
Romanian male handball players
Sportspeople from Brașov
CSA Steaua București (handball) players
Handball players at the 1976 Summer Olympics
Handball players at the 1980 Summer Olympics
Handball players at the 1984 Summer Olympics
Olympic handball players of Romania
Olympic silver medalists for Romania
Olympic bronze medalists for Romania
Olympic medalists in handball
Medalists at the 1984 Summer Olympics
Medalists at the 1980 Summer Olympics
Medalists at the 1976 Summer Olympics